Žikica Milosavljević (born 14 January 1972) is a Serbian handball coach and assistant coach Serbia national handball team and former player.

Club career
After starting out at his hometown club Dinamo Pančevo, Milosavljević spent one year with Kumanovo, before joining Crvena zvezda in 1994. He played for five seasons for the club, winning three consecutive national championships.

In 1999, Milosavljević went abroad to Slovenia and spent two years with Prule 67, before switching to fellow Slovenian club Celje. He helped them win the EHF Champions League in the 2003–04 season. Later on, Milosavljević played for Spanish teams Cantabria (2004–2007) and Valladolid (2007–2010).

International career
Milosavljević represented Serbia and Montenegro (known as FR Yugoslavia until 2003) in 10 major international tournaments, winning two bronze medals at the World Championships (1999 and 2001). He also participated in the 2000 Summer Olympics.

Honours
Crvena zvezda
 Handball Championship of FR Yugoslavia: 1995–96, 1996–97, 1997–98
 Handball Cup of FR Yugoslavia: 1994–95, 1995–96
Celje
 Slovenian First League: 2002–03, 2003–04
 Slovenian Cup: 2003–04
 EHF Champions League: 2003–04
Valladolid
 EHF Cup Winners' Cup: 2008–09

References

External links
 Olympic record
 

1972 births
Living people
Sportspeople from Pančevo
Serbian male handball players
Yugoslav male handball players
Olympic handball players of Yugoslavia
Handball players at the 2000 Summer Olympics
RK Crvena zvezda players
CB Cantabria players
BM Valladolid players
RK Metaloplastika players
Liga ASOBAL players
Expatriate handball players
Serbia and Montenegro expatriate sportspeople in North Macedonia
Serbia and Montenegro expatriate sportspeople in Slovenia
Serbia and Montenegro expatriate sportspeople in Spain
Serbian handball coaches
Serbian expatriate sportspeople in Bosnia and Herzegovina